Lucy Newlyn (born 1956) is a poet and academic. She is Emeritus Fellow in English at St Edmund Hall, Oxford, having retired as professor of English Language and Literature at the University of Oxford in 2016.

Newlyn is a specialist in eighteenth- and early nineteenth-century poetry.

Early life and education 
Lucy Newlyn was born in 1956 in Kampala, Uganda. She grew up in Leeds, where she attended Lawnswood High School, winning an open scholarship to read English at Lady Margaret Hall, Oxford in 1974. She took up her Oxford place in 1975 and graduated with a Congratulatory First in 1978. Her D.Phil. thesis, supervised by Dr Roy Park, was later published as an Oxford English Monograph by Oxford University Press.

Career
In 1984 (after a year as a lecturer at Christ Church) Newlyn took up a Stipendiary Lectureship at St Edmund Hall. Two years later, she was elected as the A.C. Cooper Fellow and Tutor in English there – a permanent post which she held in conjunction with a CUF Lecturership in the Oxford English Faculty. Newlyn gained the title Professor of English Language and Literature in 2005. She is Honorary Professor at the University of Aberystwyth, an Advisory Editor of the journal Romanticism, a Fellow of the English Association, and a Patron of the Wordsworth Trust. She was literary editor of The Oxford Magazine from 2011 to 2018. She was co-founder, with Stuart Estell, of the Hall Writers' Forum, an online resource launched in 2013 for the exchange of writing and discussion of literature and the arts. In 2015, she led the campaign to elect Wole Soyinka as Oxford Professor of Poetry.

Work 
Lucy Newlyn's longstanding research interests are eighteenth- and early nineteenth-century literature, especially poetry and non-fictional prose in the Romantic period; influences on Romanticism; the reception of Romanticism; creativity and multiple authorship; allusion and intertextuality; reader-response and reception theory. She is an authority on Wordsworth and Coleridge, and has published extensively in the field of English Romantic literature, including four books with Oxford University Press and the Cambridge Companion to Coleridge. Her book Reading, Writing, and Romanticism: The Anxiety of Reception won the British Academy’s Rose Mary Crawshay prize in 2001: 'a signal contribution to British Romantic studies and literary theory'.

Since 2003, Newlyn has been researching the prose of Edward Thomas. Her edition of his book Oxford came out in 2005. This was followed by several articles on Thomas, as well as Branch-Lines: Edward Thomas and Contemporary Poetry, co-edited with Guy Cuthbertson. She is general co-editor of Edward Thomas, Selected Prose Writings, a six-volume edition for Oxford University Press. Together, she and Cuthbertson edited England and Wales. Newlyn's 2013  scholarly work, her book William and Dorothy Wordsworth: All in Each Other (2013), brought together many of her research interests.

Poetry 
Newlyn is a published poet and anthologist, as well as an academic. Her first collection, Ginnel (Oxford Poets/Carcanet, 2005) concerns her ‘intense local attachment’ to the streets and alleys of Headingley in Leeds, where she grew up. ‘Baking’ was ‘Highly Commended’ by the judges of the Forward Prize and re-printed in The Forward Book of Poetry (Faber and Faber, 2005). Poems from the collection have also appeared in The Guardian, The Independent, The Yorkshire Post, Oxford Today, The English Review, and The Oxford Magazine. A recording of Ginnel, read by Sherry Baines, has been published as a ‘Daisy Book’ CD by the Royal National Institute of Blind People (RNIB).

Newlyn's second collection, Earth's Almanac (Enitharmon Press, 2015) was written in the fifteen years after the death of her sister. In 2019, Newlyn's collection of 135 sonnets about the Wordsworths, Vital Stream,  was published by Carcanet, in association with the Wordsworth Trust. In 2020, Newlyn's collection, The Marriage Hearse, was published by Maytree Press. The collection explores the impact of infertility on an imaginary Edwardian couple.

In 2021, she published The Craft of Poetry: A Primer in Verse, a handbook on how to write poetry, written as poetry, and in 2022, her collection Quicksilver was published by Lapwing Publications in Belfast.

In addition to her own poetry, Newlyn has published several anthologies of poetry and coordinated a number of collaborative writing projects. Together with Jenny Lewis, she was awarded a grant from Oxford University’s Institute for the Advancement of University Learning in 2002 to undertake research based on workshops at St Edmund Hall. Their findings (together with the students’ writing) were published in Synergies: Creative Writing in Academic Practice (2003; 2004). Newlyn was poet-in-residence for The Guardian in November 2005. She ran university workshops on ‘The Craft of Writing’ with Christopher Ricks during his tenure as Professor of Poetry; between 2001 and 2016 she ran regular writing workshops for students at St Edmund Hall. Her Facebook group The Craft of Poetry was a writing workshop which ran for one year after the publication of that book.

Memoir 
Newlyn's personal experience of bipolar disorder is described in her fifteen-year memoir, Diary of a Bipolar Explorer. The book combines poetry with prose, and seeks to de-stigmatise mental illness.

Personal life
Married to economist Martin Slater, Lucy Newlyn has two step children and one daughter.

Selected publications

References

1956 births
Living people
Rose Mary Crawshay Prize winners
Wordsworth family
English women poets
English literary critics
Women literary critics
20th-century English women writers
21st-century English women writers
20th-century English non-fiction writers
21st-century English poets
People from Kampala
Writers from Leeds
Alumni of Lady Margaret Hall, Oxford
Fellows of St Edmund Hall, Oxford
Fellows of the English Association
English women non-fiction writers
People educated at Lawnswood High School